Veejay may refer to:
 VJ (media personality), a television announcer who introduces music videos
 Veejay (software), a video instrument mixer and sampler for real-time performances
 Vee-Jay Records, an American record label

See also 

 VJ (disambiguation)
 Vijay (disambiguation)